Ada Tschechowa (9 September 1916 – 28 January 1966) was a Russo-German actress and music manager.

Life
Ada Mikhailovna Chekhova was born to esteemed actors Olga and Michael Chekhov on 9 September 1916 in Moscow, Russia. In 1921, her family moved to Berlin, where she grew up. From a young age, Ada followed in the path of her parents and grew an interest in becoming a theater actress, which led her to attending the Staatliche Schauspielschule in Berlin and private lessons with Walter Franck. 

In April 1935, she tried out for and was accepted for an Austrian production of The Pompadour and The Empress's Favourite the following year. Until the end of World War II she played in two more movies, and then in Secret of a Marriage in 1951. Ada played primarily in the theater for the Agency for Film and Television in the Berlin artist's colony and supervised such people as Angelika Meissner and Rex Gildo.

Until 1934, Ada was married to cinematographer Franz Weihmayr, then to physician Wilhelm Rust until 1950, and finally with boxer Conny Rux, with whom she had a son, Mikhail, called "Mischa".

From her second marriage, Ada gave birth to a daughter, Vera, in 1940. Ada, according to her daughter, was very protective of Vera. In one instance, recorded in an interview with Frau im Spiegel and Vera Tschechowa, Elvis Presley met Vera and asked if he could accompany her home, which offer was negatively received by Ada.

Ada died in the Lufthansa Flight 005 accident near Bremen, Germany, in 1966 aged 49 and was buried at
Friedhof Gräfelfing, 
Gräfelfing near Munich.

Selected filmography
 With the Eyes of a Woman (1942)

References
 Renata Helker / German Theater Museum: The Chekhov. Ways to Modernity. Berlin, 2005

Notes

Citations

External links
 
  Autogram card
 Images of Ada Tschechowa

1916 births
1966 deaths
German film actresses
Actresses from Moscow
Soviet emigrants to Germany
Russian film actresses
Victims of aviation accidents or incidents in Germany
Victims of aviation accidents or incidents in 1966
German actresses